Wassili Leps (May 12, 1870 – December 22, 1942) was a Russian-born American composer and conductor.  Born near Saint Petersburg, he came to the United States in 1894. He first went to New Orleans, and then settled in Philadelphia, where he became active in musical circles. He frequently conducted at the summer music festivals in Willow Grove Park.  He wrote numerous operas; Hoshi-San was premiered in Philadelphia in 1909. From 1932-1942 he was the director and conductor of the Providence Symphony Orchestra in Rhode Island. He died in 1942 in Toronto.

References

External links
 

1870 births
1942 deaths
American male composers
American composers
American conductors (music)
American male conductors (music)
Emigrants from the Russian Empire to the United States
American people of Russian descent